The War that Time Forgot was a comic book feature published by DC Comics beginning in 1960 in the title Star Spangled War Stories, created by Robert Kanigher, Ross Andru and Mike Esposito. It ran for eight years, ending in 1968 and returned as a limited series in 2008.

Featuring a combination of science fantasy and World War II comic motifs, the stories featured a group of American soldiers, stranded on an uncharted island during the Pacific War which they discover is populated by dinosaurs. This location was later named Dinosaur Island.

Publication history
The War that Time Forgot was created by writer/editor Robert Kanigher and artists Ross Andru and Mike Esposito in Star Spangled War Stories #90 (May 1960). They continued to compose most of the stories during the comic's run. During its time, it was the main feature of the title.

The title and some of the premises might have been influenced by Edgar Rice Burroughs's The Land That Time Forgot, in which soldiers and sailors of World War I are stranded on a dinosaur-haunted land near Antarctica.

The protagonists of the early adventures were not usually recurring, but a few of them appeared more than once. Among them are two soldiers named Larry and Charlie (Star Spangled War Stories #90, 92), the airborne brothers Henry, Steve and Tommy Frank a.k.a. "The Flying Boots" (Star Spangled War Stories #99–100, 104–105), early prototypes of the G.I. Robot (Star Spangled War Stories #101–103, 125) members of the original Suicide Squad (Star Spangled War Stories #110–111, 116–121, 125, 127–128), sailors PT and Prof (Star Spangled War Stories #110–111) and the flying ace called "The Brother with No Wings" (Star Spangled War Stories #129, 131). 
 
The series ran in Star Spangled War Stories from issues #90-137 (although issues #91, 93 and 126 did not feature The War That Time Forgot stories). The final story was in the Feb.-March 1968 issue of Star Spangled War Stories; afterwards, the Enemy Ace, a German World War I pilot, became the focus of the book and the dinosaur storyline was retired. In 1973, some of these stories were reprinted in Four Star Battle Tales #3 and G.I. War Tales #1 and 2. The War That Time Forgot re-appeared in the October 1976 issue (#195)  of G.I. Combat, featuring the Haunted Tank.

In the 1980s, DC briefly revisited The War that Time Forgot in a run as one of the features in Weird War Tales (#100). During the series run in Weird War Tales, Dinosaur Island was visited by the Creature Commandos and the G.I. Robot. This was the World War II version of the Commandos.

Dinosaur Island was also featured in Tim Truman's 1998 four-issue miniseries, Guns of the Dragon. The 1920s set miniseries provided a sort of origin story for the island.

In Darwyn Cooke's 2003 alternate-universe mini-series DC: The New Frontier, Dinosaur Island was revisited yet again as part of its opening prelude. Here, it is visited by the military team known as The Losers.

In May 2008, Bruce Jones launched The War that Time Forgot as a 12-issue limited series, featuring the Enemy Ace, Firehair, and Tomahawk on one side and the Golden Gladiator, the Viking Prince and the G.I. Robot on the other.

Collections
A DC Showcase Presents black and white trade paperback collection, The War that Time Forgot, was published in 2007. It reprints the stories that originally appeared between 1960 and 1966.

The 2008 series was collected in two volumes:
The War That Time Forgot Vol. 1 (collects The War That Time Forgot #1-6)
The War That Time Forgot Vol. 2 (collects The War That Time Forgot #7-12)

In other media

Television
 Dinosaur Island is featured in the Batman: The Brave and the Bold episode "Terror on Dinosaur Island!". Gorilla Grodd and his followers used it as the base for their headquarters. Grodd comments that the Bahamas, the West Indies and Florida are within a 500-mile radius of Dinosaur Island. The island is also featured in the team-up with the Challengers of the Unknown in "Revenge of the Reach!". In "Four Star Spectacular!", Dinosaur Island appeared where the Creature Commandos teamed up with Batman to thwart the Ultra-Humanite when he plans to build a mind-controlled dinosaur army. After the Ultra-Humanite was defeated, the Creature Commandos destroy Lt. Matthew Shrieve's footage of Dinosaur Island to keep the island's location a secret.
 A variation of Dinosaur Island appears in the Justice League Action episode "Booster's Gold". After seeing a film where scientists cloned dinosaurs back to life, Booster Gold starts his latest money-making venture where he brings some dinosaurs to an island near the Bermuda Triangle and established Dinosaur Island and the vacation village Booster World. When the Green Arrow arrived and learned of Booster Gold's plan, it did not go well, even with the Green Arrow telling Booster Gold about the plan in the movie not going well as the two of them work to evade the carnivorous dinosaurs.
 DC Showcase: The Losers has the titular team trapped in the equivalent setting on Dinosaur Island.

Film
The Centre is featured as the main antagonist in Justice League: The New Frontier, voiced by Keith David. This version is a monstrous creature born from the Earth that has the appearance of a floating island, and developed traits far beyond those of lesser beings. An organic sentient being observed the evolution of dinosaurs, the meteor shower, and the evolution of humans. It saw humans as a threat to the existence of other species and settled in the Pacific. Over the centuries, it has gained a reputation of an omnipresent spirit with no beginning nor end. Different cultures describe the same legend, the coming of an ominous, all-powerful presence and great suffering. The Centre is a living being the size of an island that can fly by means of energy propulsion, transform its substance to extrude tentacles and spawn giant dinosaur minions, project energy and inhale structures through its ports, and has mental powers like illusion casting, telepathy, and mind control over people with high susceptibility. The famous children's author, Theodore Smiesel was overcome by the Centre's telepathy and wrote "The Last Story" describing the Centre. After the book's completion, Smiesel committed suicide by gunshot. After it rose in 1957, there was a steady rise in the number of mass delusions and people hearing voices in their heads and performing violent acts. It came across Paradise Island and attacked the Amazons. Wonder Woman was able to escape and warn Superman before the Centre reaches America. A collective of government officials and superheroes formed a multi-faceted plan to defeat the Centre off the coast of Florida. While they distract it with explosive payloads from outside and within, the Flash would expose it piece by piece with matter shrinking technology created by Ray Palmer. It sensed its end and attempted to make a suicide run at Cape Canaveral. Green Lantern intervened and used his newly discovered powers to encapsulate the Centre and hurl it into space where its body implodes.

References

External links
 Review of The War that Time Forgot #1, Comic Book Resources
 Sunday Slugfest: The War that Time Forgot #1, Comics Bulletin

1960 in comics
2008 comics debuts
Defunct American comics
Fantasy comics
DC Comics set during World War II
Dinosaurs in comic books
Comics by Robert Kanigher